Fenozolone (Ordinator) was developed by Laboratoires Dausse in the 1960s and is a psychostimulant related to pemoline.

See also 
 4-Methylaminorex
 Aminorex
 Clominorex
 Cyclazodone
 Fluminorex
 Pemoline
 Thozalinone

References 

Stimulants
Aminorexes
Norepinephrine-dopamine releasing agents
Oxazolones
Phenyl compounds